Sabana Buey is a town in the Peravia province of the Dominican Republic. The current mayor of this town is Rosa Maria Sanchez.

Sources 
 – World-Gazetteer.com

Populated places in Peravia Province